Roscidotoga lamingtonia is a moth of the family Nepticulidae. It is found in southern Queensland and northern New South Wales (the McPherson Range).

The wingspan is 5–5.1 mm for males. The forewings are dark fuscous. The basal third is bluish metallic. There are silver metallic scales with bluish reflections scattered in the distal two thirds. The hindwings are grey brown.

The larvae feed on Sloanea woollsii. They mine the leaves of their host plant. The mine has the form of a more or less contorted linear gallery with linear frass throughout. Later, it is slightly dispersed, but still leaves broad margins. The exit-hole is located on the upperside. Pupation takes place in a brown cocoon.

Etymology
The species name is derived from the type locality, Lamington National Park.

References

Moths of Australia
Moths described in 2011
Nepticulidae